Palestine participated in the 2002 Asian Games held in Busan, South Korea, from September 29 to October 14, 2002. Athletes from Palestine won only one bronze medal, and finished at the 36th spot in the medal table.

References

Nations at the 2002 Asian Games
2002
Asian Games